George E. "Chip" Campsen III (born March 30, 1959) is a Republican member of the South Carolina Senate, representing the 43rd District since 2004. Previously, he was a member of the South Carolina House of Representatives from 1996 through 2002. He was the only state senator that voted against the Base Load Review Act in 2004 that led to the failure of the VC Summer Nuclear Project expansion.

References

External links
 https://www.scvotes.gov/cgi-bin/scsec/r1
 https://www.scstatehouse.gov/member.php?code=0302272691&session=112
 https://ballotpedia.org/George_Campsen#Biography
 https://justfacts.votesmart.org/candidate/biography/11920/chip-campsen-iii

Republican Party South Carolina state senators
Republican Party members of the South Carolina House of Representatives
1959 births
Living people
21st-century American politicians